

Sovereign states

A
 Afghanistan –  
 –  
Angoche –  
 Anhalt-Bernburg –  
 Anhalt-Dessau –  
 Anhalt-Köthen – 
 Ankole –  
 Annam –  
Anziku –  
 –   
 Aro –  
 –  
Aussa –  
 –

B
 –  
Baguirmi – Kingdom of Baguirmi 
Bamana – Bambara Empire 
Baol – Kingdom of Baol 
 Barotseland – 
Basutoland – Kingdom of Basutoland
Baté Empire – Baté Empire 
 – Kingdom of Bavaria 
 – Kingdom of Belgium 
 – Benin Empire 
Bhutan – Kingdom of Bhutan 
 Bohemia – Kingdom of Bohemia 
 →  Bolivia – Bolivian Republic 
 Bora Bora – Kingdom of Bora Bora
 Bornu – Bornu Empire 
 –  
 – 
 British India - Indian Empire 
 – Sultanate of Brunei
 – Duchy of Brunswick
 Buganda – Kingdom of Buganda
 Bukhara – Emirate of Bukhara
Bundu - State of Bundu 
 Bunyoro – Kingdom of Bunyoro-Kitara
 Burma – Kingdom of Burma
Burundi – Kingdom of Burundi

C
 Cambodia – Kingdom of Cambodia
Cayor – Kingdom of Cayor
 Central Italy – United Provinces of Central Italy 
 – Republic of Chile
China – Great Qing Empire
Cook Islands  Rarotonga
 – Republic of Costa Rica
 Couto Misto
 Croatia – Kingdom of Croatia (Habsburg)

D
Dahomey – Kingdom of Dahomey 
Dendi – Dendi Kingdom
 – Kingdom of Denmark
 – Dominican Republic

E
 – Republic of Ecuador
 El Salvador – El Salvador
 – Ethiopian Empire

F
Fiji – Tui Viti
Finland – Grand Duchy of Finland
 France
 French Republic 
 French Empire 
 Frankfurt – Free City of Frankfurt
Futa Jallon – Imamate of Futa Jallon
Futa Toro – Imamate of Futa Toro

G
 Garhwal – Garhwal Kingdom
Garo – Kingdom of Garo
Gaza – Gaza Empire
Gera – Kingdom of Gera
Gomma – Kingdom of Gomma
 Granadine Confederation – Granadine Confederation 
 Greece – Kingdom of Greece
 →  →  Guatemala – Republic of Guatemala
Gumma – Kingdom of Gumma
Gyaaman – State of Gyaaman

H
 Ha'il – Emirate of Ha'il
 →  Haiti
 Empire of Haiti 
Republic of Haiti 
 – Free city of Hamburg
 – Kingdom of Hanover
 Hawaii – Kingdom of Hawaii
 Hesse-Darmstadt – Grand Duchy of Hesse and by Rhine
 Hesse-Homburg – Landgraviate of Hesse-Homburg
 Hesse-Kassel (or Hesse-Cassel) – Electorate of Hesse
 Hohenzollern-Hechingen – Principality of Hohenzollern-Hechingen 
 Hohenzollern-Sigmaringen – Principality of Hohenzollern-Sigmaringen 
 Holstein – Duchy of Holstein
 – Republic of Honduras
 Huahine – Kingdom of Huahine
 Hungary – Kingdom of Hungary
 Huraa – Huraa dynasty
 (princely state of British India)

J
Janjero – Kingdom of Janjero
Japan – Tokugawa shogunate
Jimma – Kingdom of Jimma
 Johor – Johor Sultanate
 – Jolof Kingdom

K
Kaabu – Kingdom of Kaabu
Kabulistan – Kingdom of Kabul 
Kaffa – Kingdom of Kaffa
 Kathiri – Kathiri Sultanate of Seiyun in Hadramaut
Kénédougou – Kénédougou Kingdom
Khasso – Kingdom of Khasso
 Khiva – Khanate of Khiva
Kokand – Khanate of Kokand
Kong – Kong Empire
 Kongo – Kingdom of Kongo
  →  Korea – Kingdom of Great Joseon
Koya Temne – Kingdom of Koya

L
 – Republic of Liberia
 →  – Principality of Liechtenstein
 Limburg – Duchy of Limburg
Limmu-Ennarea – Kingdom of Limmu-Ennarea
 Lippe – Principality of Lippe-Detmoldt
Loango – Kingdom of Loango
 Lombardy–Venetia – Kingdom of Lombardy–Venetia
Luba – Luba Empire
 Lubeck – Free City of Lubeck
Lunda – Lunda Empire
 – Grand Duchy of Luxembourg

M
Maldives – Sultanate of Maldives
 Mangareva – Kingdom of Mangareva
Manipur – Kingdom of Manipur
 Maryland – State of Maryland in Africa 
Massina – Massina Empire
Matabeleland – Matabele Kingdom
 Mecklenburg-Schwerin – Grand Duchy of Mecklenburg-Schwerin
 Mecklenburg-Strelitz – Grand Duchy of Mecklenburg-Strelitz
 – Republic of Mexico
Mindanao – Sultanate of Maguindanao
 Modena – Duchies of Modena and Reggio
 Moldavia - Principality of Moldavia
 – Principality of Monaco
 →  Montenegro
Prince-Bishopric of Montenegro 
Principality of Montenegro 
 – Sultanate of Morocco
 Muscat and Oman – Sultanate of Muscat and Oman

N
 Nassau – Duchy of Nassau
 Negeri Sembilan – Negeri Sembilan
 Nejd – Emirate of Nejd
 Nepal - Kingdom of Nepal
 – Kingdom of the Netherlands
 New Granada – Republic of New Granada (renamed Granadine Confederation on May 22, 1858)
 →  →  Nicaragua – Republic of Nicaragua
 Norway – Kingdom of Norway (in personal union with Sweden)
Nri – Kingdom of Nri

O
 Oldenburg – Grand Duchy of Oldenburg
 – Republic of Orange Free State 
 – Sublime Ottoman State
Ouaddai – Ouaddai Empire
Oyo – Oyo Empire

P
 Pahang – Sultanate of Pahang
 – States of the Church
 – Republic of Paraguay
 – Duchy of Parma, Piacenza and Guastalla 
 Perak – Sultanate of Perak
 Persia – Sublime State of Persia
 – Peruvian Republic
 Portugal – Kingdom of Portugal
 – Kingdom of Prussia

Q
 Qu'aiti – Qu'aiti Sultanate of Shihr and Muqalla in Hadramaut

R
 Raiatea – Kingdom of Raiatea
Rapa Nui – Kingdom of Rapa Nui
 Rarotonga – Kingdom of Rarotonga 
 Reuss Elder Line – Principality of Reuss Elder Line
 Reuss Junior Line – Principality of Reuss Junior Line
 →  – Russian Empire
Rwanda – Kingdom of Rwanda
 – Kingdom of Ryūkyū

S
Samoa – Kingdom of Samoa
 San Marino – Most Serene Republic of San Marino
 – Kingdom of Sarawak
 – Kingdom of Sardinia
 Saxe-Altenburg – Duchy of Saxe-Altenburg
 Saxe-Coburg-Gotha – Duchy of Saxe-Coburg and Gotha
 Saxe-Meiningen – Duchy of Saxe-Meiningen
 Saxe-Weimar-Eisenach – Grand Duchy of Saxe-Weimar-Eisenach
 – Kingdom of Saxony
 Schaumburg-Lippe – Principality of Schaumburg-Lippe
 Schleswig – Duchy of Schleswig
 Schwarzburg-Rudolstadt – Principality of Schwarzburg-Rudolstadt
 Schwarzburg-Sondershausen – Principality of Schwarzburg-Sondershausen
 Selangor – Sultanate of Selangor
 Serbia – Principality of Serbia
 – Kingdom of Siam
Sikkim – Chogyalate of Sikkim
 Sokoto – Sokoto Caliphate
South African Republic  Transvaal
 – Kingdom of Spain
 Sulu – Sultanate of Sulu
 – Kingdom of Sweden (in personal union with Norway)
 – Swiss Confederation

T
 Tahiti – Kingdom of Tahiti
Tonga – Tu'i Tonga
 Toro – Toro Kingdom
Toucouleur – Toucouleur Empire
 – South African Republic 
 Tuscany – Grand Duchy of Tuscany
 – Kingdom of the Two Sicilies

U
 – United Kingdom of Great Britain and Ireland
 →  – United States of America
 United States of the Ionian Islands – United States of the Ionian Islands
 – Eastern Republic of Uruguay

V
 →  →  – Republic of Venezuela

W
 Waldeck-Pyrmont – Principality of Waldeck and Pyrmont
Welayta – Kingdom of Welayta
 – Kingdom of Württemberg

Y
 Yeke – Yeke Kingdom

Z
Zululand – Kingdom of Zululand

Non-sovereign territories

Oldenburg
  Lordship of In- and Kniphausen, protectorate of Oldenburg to 1854.

United Kingdom
 – Cape of Good Hope

States claiming sovereignty
 Aceh – Sultanate of Aceh
 Germany – German Empire 
Goust – Republic of Goust
 State of Buenos Aires 
 Taiping Heavenly Kingdom - Heavenly Kingdom of Great Peace 
 Tavolara – Kingdom of Tavolara

References

1850s
State
State